Henry Hudson ( 1565 – disappeared 23 June 1611) was an English sea explorer and navigator during the early 17th century, best known for his explorations of present-day Canada and parts of the northeastern United States.

In 1607 and 1608, Hudson made two attempts on behalf of English merchants to find a rumoured Northeast Passage to Cathay via a route above the Arctic Circle. In 1609, he landed in North America on behalf of the Dutch East India Company and explored the region around the modern New York metropolitan area. Looking for a Northwest Passage to Asia on his ship  Halve Maen ("Half Moon"), he sailed up the Hudson River, which was later named after him, and thereby laid the foundation for Dutch colonization of the region.

On his final expedition, while still searching for the Northwest Passage, Hudson became the first European to see Hudson Strait and the immense Hudson Bay. In 1611, after wintering on the shore of James Bay, Hudson wanted to press on to the west, but most of his crew mutinied. The mutineers cast Hudson, his son, and seven others adrift; the Hudsons and their companions were never seen again.

Early life 
Virtually nothing of Hudson's early life is known for certain. His year of birth is variously estimated between 1560 and 1570. He may have been born in London and it is possible that his father was an alderman of that city. When Hudson first entered the historical record in 1607, he was already an experienced mariner with sufficient credentials to be commissioned the leader of an expedition charged with a search for a trade route across the North Pole.

Exploration

Expeditions of 1607 and 1608 
In 1607, the Muscovy Company of England hired Hudson to find a northerly route to the Pacific coast of Asia. At the time, the English were engaged in an economic battle with the Dutch for control of northwest routes. It was thought that, because the sun shone for three months in the northern latitudes in the summer, the ice would melt and a ship could make it across the "top of the world".

On 1 May 1607, Hudson sailed with a crew of ten men and a boy on the 80-ton Hopewell. They reached the east coast of Greenland on 13 May, coasting northward until 22  May. Here the party named a headland "Young's Cape", a "very high mount, like a round castle" near it "Mount of God's Mercy" and land at 73° north latitude "Hold with Hope". After turning east, they sighted "Newland" (Spitsbergen) on 27 May near the mouth of the great bay Hudson later simply named the "Great Indraught" (Isfjorden).

On 13 July, Hudson and his crew estimated that they had sailed as far north as 80° 23′ N, but more likely only reached 79° 23′ N. The following day they entered what Hudson later in the voyage named "Whales Bay" (Krossfjorden and Kongsfjorden), naming its northwestern point "Collins Cape" (Kapp Mitra) after his boatswain, William Collins. They sailed north the following two days. On 16 July, they reached as far north as Hakluyt's Headland (which Thomas Edge says Hudson named on this voyage) at 79° 49′ N, thinking they saw the land continue to 82° N (Svalbard's northernmost point is 80° 49′ N) when really it trended to the east. Encountering ice packed along the north coast, they were forced to turn back south. Hudson wanted to make his return "by the north of Greenland to Davis his Streights (Davis Strait), and so for Kingdom of England", but ice conditions would have made this impossible. The expedition returned to Tilbury Hope on the River Thames on 15 September.

Hudson reported large numbers of whales in Spitsbergen waters during this voyage. Many authors credit his reports as the catalyst for several nations sending whaling expeditions to the islands. This claim is contentious—others have pointed to strong evidence that it was Jonas Poole's reports in 1610, that led to the establishment of English whaling, and voyages of Nicholas Woodcock and Willem Cornelisz van Muyden in 1612, which led to the establishment of Dutch, French and Spanish whaling. The whaling industry itself was built by neither Hudson nor Poole—both were dead by 1612.

In 1608, English merchants of the East India and Muscovy Companies again sent Hudson in the Hopewell to attempt to locate a passage to the Indies, this time to the east around northern Russia. Leaving London on 22 April, the ship travelled almost , making it to Novaya Zemlya well above the Arctic Circle in July, but even in the summer they found the ice impenetrable and turned back, arriving at Gravesend on 26 August.

Alleged discovery of Jan Mayen 
According to Thomas Edge, "William  Hudson" in 1608 discovered an island he named "Hudson's Tutches" (Touches) at 71° N, the latitude of Jan Mayen. However, records of Hudson's voyages suggest that he could only have come across Jan Mayen in 1607 by making an illogical detour, and historians have pointed out that Hudson himself made no mention of it in his journal. There is also no cartographical proof of this supposed discovery.

Jonas Poole in 1611 and Robert Fotherby in 1615 both had possession of Hudson's journal while searching for his elusive Hold-with-Hope—which is now believed to have been on the east coast of Greenland—but neither had any knowledge of any discovery of Jan Mayen, an achievement which was only later attributed to Hudson. Fotherby eventually stumbled across Jan Mayen, thinking it a new discovery and naming it "Sir Thomas Smith's Island", though the first verifiable records of the discovery of the island had been made a year earlier, in 1614.

Expedition of 1609 

In 1609, Hudson was chosen by merchants of the Dutch East India Company in the Netherlands to find an easterly passage to Asia. While awaiting orders and supplies in Amsterdam, he heard rumours of a northwest route to the Pacific through North America. Hudson had been told to sail through the Arctic Ocean north of Russia, into the Pacific and so to the Far East. Hudson departed Amsterdam on 4 April, in command of the Dutch ship  (English: Half Moon). He could not complete the specified (eastward) route because ice blocked the passage, as with all previous such voyages, and he turned the ship around in mid-May while somewhere east of Norway's North Cape. At that point, acting outside his instructions, Hudson pointed the ship west and decided to try to seek a westerly passage through North America.

They reached the Grand Banks of Newfoundland on 2 July, and in mid-July made landfall near the LaHave area of Nova Scotia. Here they encountered Indigenous peoples in Canada who were accustomed to trading with the French; they were willing to trade beaver pelts, but apparently no trades occurred. The ship stayed in the area about ten days, the crew replacing a broken mast and fishing for food. On the 25 July, a dozen men from the Halve Maen, using muskets and small cannon, went ashore and assaulted the village near their anchorage. They drove the people from the settlement and took their boat and other property—probably pelts and trade goods.

On 4 August, the ship was at Cape Cod, from which Hudson sailed south to the entrance of the Chesapeake Bay. Rather than entering the Chesapeake he explored the coast to the north, finding Delaware Bay but continuing on north. On 3 September, he reached the estuary of the river that initially was called the "North River" or "Mauritius" and now carries his name. He was not the first European to discover the estuary, though, as it had been known since the voyage of Giovanni da Verrazzano in 1524.

On 6 September 1609, John Colman of his crew was killed by natives with an arrow to his neck. Hudson sailed into the Upper New York Bay on 11 September, and the following day encountered a group of 28 Lenape canoes, buying oysters and beans from the Native Americans, and then began a journey up what is now known as the Hudson River. Over the next ten days his ship ascended the river, reaching a point near Kinderhook, and the ship's boat with five crew members ventured to the vicinity of present-day Albany.

On 23 September, Hudson decided to return to Europe. He put in at Dartmouth, England on 7 November, and was detained by authorities who wanted access to his log. He managed to pass the log to the Dutch ambassador to England, who sent it, along with his report, to Amsterdam.

While exploring the river, Hudson had traded with several native groups, mainly obtaining furs. His voyage was used to establish Dutch claims to the region and to the fur trade that prospered there when a trading post was established at Albany in 1614. New Amsterdam on Manhattan Island became the capital of New Netherland in 1625.

Expedition of 1610–1611 

In 1610, Hudson obtained backing for another voyage, this time under the English flag. The funding came from the Virginia Company and the British East India Company.

On 25 June, the explorers reached what is now the Hudson Strait at the northern tip of Labrador. Following the southern coast of the strait on 2 August, the ship entered Hudson Bay. Excitement was very high due to the expectation that the ship had finally found the Northwest Passage through the continent. Hudson spent the following months mapping and exploring its eastern shores, but he and his crew did not find a passage to Asia. In November, however, the ship became trapped in the ice in James Bay, and the crew moved ashore for the winter.

Mutiny 
When the ice cleared in the spring of 1611, Hudson planned to use his Discovery to further explore Hudson Bay with the continuing goal of discovering the Passage; however, most of the members of his crew ardently desired to return home. Matters came to a head and much of the crew mutinied in June. Descriptions of the successful mutiny are one-sided, because the only survivors who could tell their story were the mutineers and those who went along with the mutiny.

In the latter class was ship's navigator, Abacuk Pricket, a survivor who kept a journal that was to become one of the sources for the narrative of the mutiny. According to Pricket, the leaders of the mutiny were Henry Greene and Robert Juet. The latter, a navigator, had accompanied Hudson on the 1609 expedition, and his account is said to be "the best contemporary record of the voyage". Pricket's narrative tells how the mutineers set Hudson, his teenage son John, and seven crewmen—men who were either sick and infirm or loyal to Hudson—adrift from the Discovery in a small shallop, an open boat, effectively marooning them in Hudson Bay. The Pricket journal reports that the mutineers provided the castaways with clothing, powder and shot, some pikes, an iron pot, some food, and other miscellaneous items.

Disappearance 

After the mutiny, Hudson's shallop broke out oars and tried to keep pace with the Discovery for some time. Pricket recalled that the mutineers finally tired of the David–Goliath pursuit and unfurled additional sails aboard the Discovery, enabling the larger vessel to leave the tiny open boat behind. Hudson and the other seven aboard the shallop were never seen again. Despite subsequent searches, including those conducted by Thomas Button in 1612, and by Zachariah Gillam in 1668–1670, their fate is unknown.

Pricket's reliability
Pricket's journal and testimony have been severely criticized for bias, on two grounds. Firstly, prior to the mutiny the alleged leaders of the uprising, Greene and Juet, had been friends and loyal seamen of Hudson. Secondly, Greene and Juet did not survive the return voyage to England (Juet, who had been the navigator on the return journey, died of starvation a few days before the company reached Ireland). Pricket knew he and the other survivors of the mutiny would be tried in England for piracy, and it would have been in his interest, and the interest of the other survivors, to put together a narrative that would place the blame for the mutiny upon men who were no longer alive to defend themselves.

The Pricket narrative became the controlling story of the expedition's disastrous end. Only eight of the thirteen mutinous crewmen survived the return voyage to Europe. They were arrested in England, and some were put on trial, but no punishment was imposed for the mutiny. One theory holds that the survivors were considered too valuable as sources of information to execute, as they had travelled to the New World and could describe sailing routes and conditions.

Legacy 
The bay visited by and named after Hudson is three times the size of the Baltic Sea, and its many large estuaries afford access to otherwise landlocked parts of Western Canada and the Arctic. This allowed the Hudson's Bay Company to exploit a lucrative fur trade along its shores for more than two centuries, growing powerful enough to influence the history and present international boundaries of western North America.

Along with Hudson Bay and Hudson Strait in Canada, many other topographical features and landmarks are named for Hudson. The Hudson River in New York and New Jersey is named after him, as are Hudson County, New Jersey, the Henry Hudson Bridge, the Henry Hudson Parkway, and the city of Hudson, New York. The unbuilt Hendrik Hudson Hotel in New York, planned circa 1897, was also to have been named after him. Instead, ten years later, an apartment building bearing the name had been constructed.

See also 
 Age of Discovery
 List of people who disappeared before 1970
 List of people who disappeared mysteriously at sea

References

Notes

Citations

Bibliography 

 

 
 

 
 
 
  Volumes XIII and XIV (Reprint 1906 J. Maclehose and sons).
 
 
 Wordie, J.M. (1922). "Jan Mayen Island", The Geographical Journal. Vol 59 (3).

External links 

 
 
 

16th-century English people
17th-century English people
17th-century explorers
1560s births
1610s deaths
1610s missing person cases
Dutch East India Company people
English explorers of North America
English navigators
Sailors from London
Explorers of Canada
Explorers of Svalbard
Explorers of the Arctic
Explorers of the United States
Lost explorers
Persons of National Historic Significance (Canada)
Sailors on ships of the Dutch East India Company
Muscovy Company